Asian box turtles are turtles of the genus Cuora in the family Geoemydidae. About 12 extant species are recognized. The keeled box turtle (Pyxidea mouhotii syn. Cuora mouhotii) is often included in this genus, or separated in the monotypic genus Pyxidea. Genus Cuora is distributed from China to Indonesia and the Philippines, throughout mainland Southeast Asia, and into northern India and Bhutan.

Description 
Cuora species are characterized by a low- (e.g. Cuora pani) to high- (e.g. Cuora picturata) domed shell, which usually has three keels on the carapace. They are reddish, yellowish, brown, grey, and/or black in color. Some species have bright yellow, black, orange, or white stripes down the length of their keels. Their body color is highly variable, but usually very intense. Most species show stripes of variable color down either side of their heads, which usually meet at the nose.

Background 
Asian box turtles are the most heavily trafficked turtles in the world. They are captured and sold as food to China, and to the United States as pets. Nancy Karraker, a University of Rhode Island associate professor, has said “Trafficking in turtles is a major issue in Southeast Asia, and it’s important that we understand the key ecological roles that species like this box turtle play before it’s too late,”

Different conservation organizations are taking action to prevent or slow down the extinction of these species, but in the past, most of the efforts failed due to lack of biological research regarding the history or genetic diversity of these species.

Behavior 
Asian box turtles are terrestrial, semiaquatic, or mainly aquatic, most spending much of their time on the edge of shallow swamps, streams, or ponds that are dense with vegetation. Most are omnivorous, but carnivores do occur.

Taxonomy and systematics 
Listed alphabetically by binomial name, the species are:
Amboina box turtle or Southeast Asian box turtle, C. amboinensis (four subspecies)
Wallacean box turtle, C. a. amboinensis
West Indonesian box turtle, C. a. couro
Malayan box turtle or domed Malayan box turtle, C. a. kamaroma
Burmese box turtle, C. a. lineata
Yellow-headed box turtle or golden-headed box turtle, Cuora aurocapitata or C. (pani) aurocapitata
Bourret's box turtle, C. bourreti
†Cuora chiangmuanensis (Late Miocene of Thailand)
Vietnamese three-striped box turtle or green rice turtle, Cuora cyclornata (three subspecies)
Chinese box turtle, yellow-margined box turtle, or golden-headed turtle, C. flavomarginata (two subspecies)
Indochinese box turtle, Vietnamese box turtle or flowerback box turtle, C. galbinifrons
McCord's box turtle, C. mccordi
†Cuora miyatai (Middle Pleistocene of Japan)
Keeled box turtle, C. mouhotii (two subspecies)
Pan's box turtle, C. pani = "C. chriskarannarum" 
Southern Vietnamese box turtle, C. picturata
†Cuora pitheca (Late Miocene of China)
Golden coin turtle or Chinese three-striped box turtle, C. trifasciata
†Cuora tungia (Lower Pleistocene of China)
Yunnan box turtle, C. yunnanensis - rediscovered in 2004, verified in 2007
Zhou's box turtle, C. zhoui = "C. pallidicephala"

Cuora serrata, originally described as C. galbinifrons serrata by Iverson & Mccord and later considered a distinct species is a  hybrid of the keeled box turtle and taxa of the Indochinese box turtle complex as shown by the genetic studies of Parham et al. and Stuart & Parham (2004). A single specimen of C. serrata has been found in the wild, lending credence to the possibility that other specimens arose through natural hybridization or even from wild populations. No Chinese turtle farm is known to produce C. serrata-like specimens. The occurrence of wild hybrids is often regarded as "evolution in progress", a terminology and point of view that is not always accepted. It has yet to be confirmed, whether all C. serrata from the wild have originated by direct hybridization of C. mouhotii and C. galbinifrons, or also by "hybridisation" of C. serrata × C. serrata.

Unnamed hybrids of several other Cuora taxa are also known, as are intergeneric hybrids such as Mauremys iversoni, a hybrid between Cuora trifasciata and Mauremys mutica, which is intentionally produced in Chinese turtle farms.

In captivity 
Wild-caught C. amboinensis specimens were frequently available in the exotic animal trade, but are getting rarer now; other species are rare to commercially extinct.

See also
 Box turtle

Notes

References

Further reading
Buskirk, J. R., et al. (2005). On the hybridisation between two distantly related Asian turtles (Testudines: Sacalia × Mauremys). Salamandra 41, 21–26.

 
Taxa named by John Edward Gray
Turtles of Asia